Werner Holl (born 28 January 1970) is a retired German pole vaulter.

He finished sixth at the 1993 World Indoor Championships and won the bronze medal at the 1997 Summer Universiade. He no-heighted at the 1992 European Indoor Championships, and competed at the 1993 World Championships without reaching the final.

Holl became German indoor champion in 1994, won a silver in 1993 and bronze in 1995. At the main German championships, he won a bronze medal in 1991 and silver medals in 1993, 1994 and 1997. He represented the club LG VfB/Kickers Stuttgart. His personal best jump was 5.80 metres, achieved indoors in March 1993 in Nördlingen.

References

1970 births
Living people
German male pole vaulters
World Athletics Championships athletes for Germany
Universiade medalists in athletics (track and field)
Universiade bronze medalists for Germany
Medalists at the 1997 Summer Universiade